Peter Parrott may refer to:

 Peter Parrott (ice hockey)
 Peter Parrott (RAF officer)